M. Karagatsis (23 June 1908 – 14 September 1960) was the pen name of the important modern Greek novelist, journalist, critic and playwright Dimitrios Rodopoulos (Δημήτριος Ροδόπουλος). The pen name M. Karagatsis is the name the novelist is known with. The letter "M." comes from Mitya, which is the Russian diminutive of Dimitris (his real name). The word "Karagatsis" comes from the tree karagatsi under the shadow of which he used to write as a young writer.

Karagatsis was born in Athens, grew up in Larissa and Thessaloniki, and studied law in France. He died in Athens.

He is associated with the "Generation of the '30s".

Evaluation
Karagatsis has been characterized as primarily a prose writer of the illusory reality of persons and situations. His writing is bold, sensual, with great imagination and a unique narrative style, and is often studied by Greek students. His first three novels (Colonel Liapkin, Chimaera and Junkermann) compose a trilogy named Acclimazation under Apollo, about foreigners who live and work in Greece.  Karagatsis sets these books in modern, cosmopolitan Greece, in contrast with the stereotype that Greek life is conservative and countrified.

Books
Karagatsis is one of the few modern Greek writers to be translated, (mainly in German, but also in English, Italian, French) and his most important works are:

Miss Nitsa ( 1929, short novel awarded by literature magazine Nea Estia)
Colonel Liapkin (1933) (Ο Συνταγματάρχης Λιάπκιν)
Junkermann (1939) (Γιούγκερμαν)
The last days of Junkermann (1940) (Τα στερνά του Γιούγκερμαν)
Lost island (1941) (Χαμένο Νησί)
The ruler of Kastropyrgos (1944) (Ο Κοτζάμπασης του Καστρόπυργου)
Great Sleep (1946) (Ο Μεγάλος Ύπνος)
Bar Eldorado (Stage play, 1946)
Blood lost and gained (1947) (Αίμα χαμένο και κερδισμένο)
Carmen (Stage play, 1948)
History of Greeks (nonfiction, 1952) (Η ιστορία των Ελλήνων)
At God's Hands (1954)
Death and Thodoros (1956) (Ο Θάνατος κι ο Θόδωρος)
Yellow envelope (1957) (Ο Κίτρινος Φάκελος)
Sergios and Vacchos (1959) (Σέργιος και Βάκχος)
The 10 (1960) (unfinished)

References

Further reading
 Η μεσοπολεμική πεζογραφία, εκδ. Σοκόλη, τ. Δ
 Β. Αθανασόπουλος, Οι μάσκες του ρεαλισμού, τ. Β-Γ, εκδ. Καστανιώτη, Αθήνα 2003
 Ιωσήφ Βιβιλάκης, «O θεατρικός Kαραγάτσης», Παράβασις, Eπιστημονικό Δελτίο Tμήματος Θεατρικών Σπουδών του Πανεπιστημίου Aθηνών,τομ. 1 (1995), Kαστανιώτης, Aθήνα, σελ. 227-258.
 Κ.Α. Δημάδης, Δικτατορία-Πόλεμος και πεζογραφία. 1936-1944, εκδ. Γνώση, ΑΘήνα 1991
 Α. Εμπειρίκος: Ο «Σέργιος και Βάκχος» του Μ. Καραγάτση, εκδόσεις «Άγρα» και «Εστία», Αθήνα 2014
 Ν.Ι. Καγκελάρης, «Σταδιακή αποδόμηση της λαϊκής δοξασίας για τη θεραπευτική δύναμη των βοτάνων στη νεοελληνική λογοτεχνία: από τον Α. Μάτεση (Ὁ Βασιλικός) ως τον Μ. Καραγάτση (Ὁ Συνταγματάρχης Λιάπκιν)»: Πρακτικά 6ου Πανελλήνιου Συνεδρίου: Φυτά και βότανα στον λαϊκό πολιτισμό και την επιστήμη. Καρδίτσα 20-22 Οκτωβρίου 2017, (επιμ.: Αυδίκος, Ε.- Κοζιού-Κολοφωτιά,Β.), Λάρισα, 2018, σελ. 243-54 
 Α. Καραντώνη, Πεζογράφοι και πεζογραφήματα της γενιάς του '30, εκδ. Παπαδήμας, Αθήνα 1977
 Κ.Μητσάκη, Νεοελληνική πεζογραφία. Η γενιά του '30, Αθήνα 1977
 Mario Vitti, H γενιά του 30. Ιδελογία και μορφή. εκδ.Ερμής, Αθήνα 1977

External links

1908 births
1960 deaths
Writers from Athens
Writers from Larissa
20th-century Greek dramatists and playwrights
Greek journalists
20th-century Greek novelists
Generation of the '30s
20th-century journalists
Greek expatriates in France